Larry Powell is a Republican member of the Kansas Senate.

Larry Powell may also refer to:

 Larry Powell (Manitoba politician), Green Party of Manitoba candidate, 2003
 Larry Powell (Gaelic footballer) see Paddy Doherty (Gaelic footballer)
Larry Powell (author) from Able Team